Carna may refer to:

Places
Cârna, a commune in Dolj County, Romania
Càrna, an island in Loch Sunart on the west coast of Scotland
Carna, County Galway, a village in Connemara in the west of Ireland

Other
 an ancient Roman deity whose identity became confused with Cardea
Carna Botnet, hijacked insecure devices online used to map IPv4 in 2012